The Gärsthorn is a mountain of the Bernese Alps, overlooking Mund in the canton of Valais. The main (north) summit has an elevation of 2,964 metres, while the southern summit has an elevation of 2,927 metres.

References

External links
 Gärsthorn on Hikr

Mountains of the Alps
Mountains of Switzerland
Mountains of Valais
Bernese Alps
Two-thousanders of Switzerland